Irina Zahharenkova (born 23 February 1976 in Kaliningrad) is an Estonian pianist and harpsichordist trained at the Estonian Academy of Music and the Sibelius Academy.

References

1976 births
Living people
People from Kaliningrad
Estonian classical pianists
21st-century classical pianists